Mark Kenneth Todd (born 4 December 1967 in Belfast) is a Northern Irish former professional footballer who played in the Football League as a midfielder.  He was the head of community development (known as Sheffield United Community Foundation) at former club Sheffield United.

References

1967 births
Living people
Association footballers from Belfast
Association football midfielders
National League (English football) players
English Football League players
Manchester United F.C. players
Sheffield United F.C. players
Wolverhampton Wanderers F.C. players
Rotherham United F.C. players
Scarborough F.C. players
Mansfield Town F.C. players
Telford United F.C. players
Stalybridge Celtic F.C. players
Blyth Spartans A.F.C. players
Sheffield United F.C. non-playing staff
Association footballers from Northern Ireland